The Novosibirsk Opera and Ballet Theatre (the official title is the Novosibirsk State Academic Opera and Ballet Theatre) is a theatre in Novosibirsk and Siberia. It is located at the center of Novosibirsk at Lenin square.

The building was completed in February 1944, and the first performance was held on 12 May 1945. , it was
the largest theatre in Russia, larger than the Bolshoi Theatre (literally "Big theatre") in Moscow.

Music directors
Current music director is Dmitri Jurowski. Previous directors were Teodor Currentzis (2004 to 2010) and Ainars Rubikis.

The building

The theater also served as the fifth Pit Stop in the fourteenth season of The Amazing Race.

References

External links

Official website (current)
Official website (former)
Photos of theater
History of the project in photographs
History of the construction in photographs

 
Opera houses in Russia
Theatres built in the Soviet Union
1944 establishments in Russia
Theatres completed in 1944
Music venues completed in 1944
Tsentralny City District, Novosibirsk
Cultural heritage monuments of federal significance in Novosibirsk Oblast